Luke Farrell may refer to:

Luke Farrell (baseball) (born 1991), American baseball pitcher
Luke Farrell (American football) (born 1997), American football tight end